Pál Vastagh (born 23 September 1946) is a Hungarian politician and jurist, who served as Minister of Justice between 1994 and 1998. He joined to the Hungarian Socialist Workers' Party (MSZMP) in 1966. During the democratic changes in Hungary (1989–1990) he supported the communist rule and the Workers' Militia which Vastagh called the "people's army". In 1989 he was a founding member of the Hungarian Socialist Party. He became ambassador to Ottawa, Canada in 2006; as a result of that he resigned from his parliamentarian seat.

References
 MTI Ki Kicsoda 2009, Magyar Távirati Iroda Zrt., Budapest, 2008, 1166. old., ISSN 1787-288X
 Vastagh Pál országgyűlési adatlapja
 Vastagh Pál életrajza az MSZP honlapján

1946 births
Living people
Justice ministers of Hungary
Hungarian communists
Hungarian Socialist Party politicians
Hungarian diplomats
Members of the National Assembly of Hungary (1990–1994)
Members of the National Assembly of Hungary (1994–1998)
Members of the National Assembly of Hungary (1998–2002)
Members of the National Assembly of Hungary (2002–2006)
Members of the National Assembly of Hungary (2006–2010)
Ambassadors of Hungary to Canada